The 1985 Detroit Lions season was their 56th in the National Football League. In Darryl Rogers first year as head coach, the team improved upon their previous season’s output of 4–11–1, winning seven games. The Lions beat four playoff teams at home, Dallas, San Francisco, Miami, and the New York Jets, but lost to Tampa Bay and Indianapolis on the road. The Lions stood at 5–3 at the halfway point of the season. However, despite their overall improvement, the Lions went winless in December (0–3) and missed the playoffs for the second straight year with a 7–9 record.

Offseason

NFL Draft

Personnel

Staff

Roster

Schedule

Season summary

Week 1

Standings

References

Detroit Lions seasons
Detroit Lions
Detroit Lions